On April 13, 1923 at 15:31 UTC, an earthquake occurred off the northern coast of the Kamchatka Peninsula in the USSR, present-day Russia. The earthquake had a surface-wave magnitude of 6.8–7.3 and an estimated moment magnitude of ~8.2. This event came just two months after a slightly larger earthquake with an epicenter struck south of the April event. Both earthquakes were tsunamigenic although the latter generated wave heights far exceeding that of the one in February. After two foreshocks of "moderate force", the main event caused considerable damage. Most of the 36 casualties were the result of the tsunami inundation rather than the earthquake.

Tectonic setting
The earthquake occurred off the Kamchatka Peninsula's east coast, which runs parallel to the Kuril-Kamchatka Trench, the area where the Pacific and Okhotsk Sea plates converge. Being older and therefore denser, the Pacific subducts beneath the Kamchatka Peninsula, which sits on the Okhotsk Sea Plate. These two plates meet along a convergent boundary, marked by the trench. The subduction zone is seismogenic and produces Kamchatka earthquakes, which occasionally generate tsunamis; some of these megathrust earthquakes are very strong (such as the 1952 magnitude 9.0 earthquake, the 5th largest ever recorded).

Earthquake

The April earthquake was part of a sequence of megathrust earthquakes on the Kamchatka Peninsula, which began in February. On February 3, a magnitude 8.4 earthquake, whose hypocenter was 15 km deep, resulted in extreme shaking assigned XI (Extreme) on the Modified Mercalli intensity scale and caused a tsunami with run-ups of 6 meters. It was followed by a magnitude 7.4 aftershock the same month.

The International Seismological Centre placed the April earthquake magnitude at 6.8  or 7.0 , while the NGDC and some older studies placed it at 7.3–7.4 . Beno Gutenberg and Charles Richter assigned the event a magnitude of 7.2 . A 2004 reevaluation of earthquakes in the region revised the earthquake magnitude to 8.2 , based on analyzing the associated tsunami. It was not considered an aftershock of the February earthquake because it ruptured another segment of the subduction zone.

Location
The epicenter coordinates of this earthquake differ across sources and journals. The International Seismological Summary placed this at 55.7°N, 162.5°E, while the ISC-GEM Catalogue lists this event as having an epicenter at 56.36° N 162.70° E. Meanwhile, Beno Gutenberg and Charles Richter suggested the epicenter location to be 56.5° N, 16.5° E. In a 2017 study, Salaree and Okal argued it was located 110 km to the north, at 57.35° N, 162.91° E, which is northwest of Bering Island. On the other hand, E.R. Engdahl's relocation places the epicenter coordinates at 56.56°N, 163.03°E, inside the Kamchatskiy Peninsula and close to the ISC-GEM coordinates.

Characteristic
The earthquake rupture displayed features analogous to that of a tsunami earthquake, which generates locally destructive tsunamis with higher run-up heights. A notable feature that makes such events unique is the release of seismic energy which happens at long periods. The release of long-period seismic energy in turn results in moderately strong to no shaking along the coast during these earthquakes. Damage patterns of tsunami earthquakes solely from shaking have been mostly smaller than expected for its size. As a result, local communities usually would have little to no advanced natural warning for when a tsunami hit. Tsunami earthquakes have slower than usual rupture velocities, which could be as slow as 1 km/s. The rupture propagates up-dip along with the shallow subduction interface towards the trench, generating tsunamis. The tsunamis generated by these earthquakes are significantly disproportionate for its surface wave magnitude as a consequence.

Tsunami
Salaree and Okal suggested that apart from the slow rupture velocity, an earthquake-triggered submarine landslide is thought to have generated the unusually high local tsunami run-ups. The presence of subaerial landslides near elevated shorelines after the earthquake was also evidence of landslide-triggering tsunamis. The landslide tsunami model also satisfactorily reproduced the tsunami height distribution. A survey of the affected region discovered high run-up heights at 20–30 meters. The tsunami affected a stretch of coastline from Cape Shubert to Cape Kamchatskiy of the Kamchatka Bay. 

A 1961 paper stated that the first tsunami wave, which was described as small, arrived at Ust-Kamchatsk 15 minutes after the earthquake. Approximately fifteen minutes later, an 11-meter-high wave began advancing onshore. The second wave was destructive, washing away structures at a nearby settlement and flowing as far as 7 km up the Kamchatka River from its mouth, being able to do so because it inundated over a coastal plain covered by a layer of thick ice. Together with the snow, it smoothened the low-lying coastal plains, allowing the tsunami to reach and cause damage far inland.

West of the Kamchatka River, the tsunami waves were reported to be higher, with run-up measuring 20–30 meters, far higher than the tsunami generated by the larger February earthquake. The Japanese-owned fish canneries and villages were totally destroyed. A small cutter belonging to the Nichiro cannery was found at a location 1–2 km inland at a height of 30 meters.

The extent of damage decreased significantly eastwards along a 10 km portion of a spit that separates Lake Nerpichye from the Kamchatka Gulf. On the spit, a cannery was completely destroyed. A newer cannery and radio station at the same location had moderate damage only. The tsunami at this location, Perevoloka, was approximately one meter high.

Other locations
A maximum run-up height of 4 meters was recorded at Bering Island but the exact location where it was measured is unknown. On the Hawaiian Islands, the tsunami was recorded 30 cm at Hilo, 20 cm at Honolulu and 8 cm at Tofino. On the United States west coast, a 15 cm wave was recorded at San Francisco while at the Port of Los Angeles, some swirls were observed between 06:00 am and 10:00 am. A weak tsunami was also recorded along the Japanese coast.

Damage and aftermath
Before the mainshock, a sequence of foreshocks was felt for four hours, keeping the residents on high alert. Two noticeable foreshocks occurred on 13 April at 21:00 and 14 April at 01:00 local time respectively. They were felt with light to moderate intensities, causing hanging items to sway slightly.

The earthquake struck at 02:00 am local time on the 14th of April. Its reported intensity was as high as X (Extreme) on the Modified Mercalli intensity scale. A local newspaper reported that many barns and dilapidated houses were destroyed. More than 230 animals perished, including dogs, cows, and pigs. Residents in towns and villages were driven out of their homes when the earthquake shook. The tremors knocked hanging photographs, dishes on shelves, and stoves to the floor. It also cracked the windows of many homes.

The tsunami killed 36 people along the coast of Kamchatka. Twenty-three of those killed were in Ust-Kamchatsk, of which there were 13 Japanese and five Russian and Chinese victims. Along the coasts, the tsunami tore off trees by the roots. A small Japanese boat was also deposited some 30 meters on top of a raised beach. At the time, the boat was occupied by a Japanese couple and when the tsunami struck, one of them was killed.

After the earthquake and tsunami, many survivors relocated to other villages upstream to avoid a similar disaster. Cherny Yar and Nizhnekamchatsk were among the villages that survivors moved into because they were situated far inland and safe from future tsunamis. Some of the remaining inhabitants of Ust-Kamchatsk later founded the small village of  because the tsunami had badly affected the main city. Others remained in the city to reconstruct the damaged city.

The Los Angeles Times on 15 April reported that flooding in the Korean of city Busan caused over 1,000 deaths. Meanwhile the Sydney Morning Herald on 16 April claimed that 400 people went missing due to a tidal wave in the same city. The news article also stated that the total number of people that perished was unknown, but believed to be large. Further analysis however, concluded that the Busan flooding occurred approximately 24 hours before the earthquake and is, therefore, an unrelated event.

See also
List of earthquakes in Russia
List of earthquakes in 1923
List of tsunamis

References

External links

1923 earthquakes
1923 tsunamis
1923 in Russia
Megathrust earthquakes in Russia
Tsunamis in Russia
Tsunamis in the United States
Tsunamis in Japan
Doublet earthquakes
Tsunami earthquakes
Natural disasters in the Russian Far East
History of the Kamchatka Peninsula
Earthquakes in the Russian Far East